{{Infobox officeholder
| name = Sun Jun
| native_name = 孫峻
| image = 
| image_size = 
| caption = 
| alt = 
| office = Imperial Chancellor (丞相)
| term_start = 
| term_end = 
| monarch = Sun Liang
| predecessor = Zhu Ju
| successor = Sun Chen
| office1 = General-in-Chief (大將軍)
| term_start1 = 
| term_end1 = 
| monarch1 = Sun Liang
| predecessor1 = Zhuge Ke
| successor1 = Sun Chen
| office2 = General of the Military Guards (武衛將軍)
| term_start2 = 
| term_end2 = 
| monarch2 = Sun Quan / Sun Liang
| birth_date = 219
| death_date =  (aged 37)
| relations = See Eastern Wu family trees
| father = Sun Gong
| occupation = General, regent
| blank1 = Courtesy name
| data1 = Ziyuan (子遠)
| blank2 = Peerage
| data2 = Marquis of Fuchun (富春侯)
}}

Sun Jun (219 – 19 October 256), courtesy name Ziyuan, was a military general and regent of the state of Eastern Wu during the Three Kingdoms period of China. He served under the second Wu emperor, Sun Liang.

Life
Sun Jun was a great-grandson of Sun Jing, an uncle of Wu's founding emperor Sun Quan; his father was Sun Gong (孙恭) and his grandfather was Sun Gao (孙暠). Late in Sun Quan's reign, he became a trusted personal assistant of Sun Quan's, and he was said to have been, in conjunction with Sun Quan's daughter Sun Luban, involved in falsely accusing the crown prince Sun He, leading to Sun He's deposal in 250. At his and Sun Luban's recommendation, Sun Quan created his youngest son Sun Liang as his successor. Again at Sun Jun's recommendation, Sun Quan named Zhuge Ke regent for Sun Liang in 251, and after his death in 252, Sun Jun became a key assistant to Zhuge.

In 253, after Zhuge Ke had suffered a major military defeat to Wu's rival state, Cao Wei, and subsequently refused to admit fault but instead tried to wipe out all dissent, Sun Jun assassinated him and took over as regent. There was initial anticipation that he might be willing to share power with other key officials, but he instead consolidated power into his own hands. He was not known for his accomplishments during his regency, and he was severe in his punishments. As a result, there were several conspiracies against his life during his regency, including one in 254 led by Sun Ying (孫英), the Marquis of Wu, the son of Sun Quan's eldest son Sun Deng, and one in 255, which Sun Luban (with whom Sun Jun might have had an affair) falsely accused her sister Sun Luyu of being the leader of, and Sun Jun had Sun Luyu executed.

In 256, at the urging of Wen Qin, a Wei general who had surrendered to Wu after a rebellion of his and Guanqiu Jian's failed, Sun Jun considered launching a major attack against Wei, but as he was about to do so, he grew ill. He transferred his powers to his cousin Sun Chen and then died. Sun Chen succeeded him.

In 258, after Sun Chen had deposed Sun Liang and had in turn been executed by the succeeding emperor Sun Xiu, Sun Jun's casket was disinterred and reduced in size, as a sign of imperial disapproval; both Sun Jun and Sun Chen were posthumously banished from the royal family and renamed Gu Jun (故峻) and Gu Chen (故綝) respectively.

See also
 Eastern Wu family trees#Sun Hao (Sun Jing's son)
 Lists of people of the Three Kingdoms

Notes

References

 Chen, Shou (3rd century). Records of the Three Kingdoms (Sanguozhi).
 Pei, Songzhi (5th century). Annotations to Records of the Three Kingdoms (Sanguozhi zhu).
 Sima, Guang (1084). Zizhi Tongjian'', vols. 75-77.

219 births
256 deaths
Eastern Wu regents
Eastern Wu generals